The Bangsamoro Hymn is the regional hymn of the Bangsamoro Autonomous Region in Muslim Mindanao, an autonomous region in the southern Philippines.

Background
Under the Bangsamoro Organic Law, the charter of the Bangsamoro Autonomous Region in Muslim Mindanao (BARMM) which succeeded the Autonomous Region in Muslim Mindanao (ARMM) is entitled to have its own regional hymn. Prior to the ratification of the Bangsamoro Organic Law, Bangsamoro having its own regional hymn was contested. Christian right-wing Buhay Partylist Representative Lito Atienza said a separate "anthem" for the Bangsamoro region would not encourage national unity and if the song is similar to the hymns used by other local government units, he insisted that then proposed legislation explicitly states "hymn" rather "anthem".

In February 2019, the Bangsamoro Transition Authority launched a competition for a new hymn for Bangsamoro, along with design competitions for a new flag and seal of the region.

A proposed legislation to adopt an official regional hymn for Bangsamoro filed before the Bangsamoro Parliament is Parliament Bill No. 2 which is also known as "An Act Adopting the Official Hymn of the Bangsamoro Autonomous Region in Muslim Mindanao (BARMM)". By August 29, 2019, the measure is already on its second reading. Three versions of the hymn in English, Tagalog and Maguindanaon languages has been proposed as per parliament member Romeo Sema, a proponent of the measure. Sema's colleague's has suggested changes to the bill such as adding a designated portion of the hymn sang by a female for gender-inclusiveness and render additional versions of the hymn in every regional language of Bangsamoro.

The Bangsamoro Parliament approved the proposed version of the Bangsamoro Hymn under Cabinet Bill no. 39 on January 30, 2020. The proposed legislation is signed into law on February 13, 2020 by Chief Minister Murad Ebrahim as Bangsamoro Autonomy Act No. 7.

Lyrics

Usage
The hymn is to be performed during flag-raising ceremonies which involve the Bangsamoro flag. The singing of the Bangsamoro hymn is mandated by law, particularly the Bangsamoro Organic Law, to be sung after the Philippine national anthem. Bangsamoro Autonomy Act No. 7 also allows for a version of the hymn in Arabic, Filipino or any other indigenous Bangsamoro languages to be officially adopted with approval of the Chief Minister.

See also
Flag of Bangsamoro
Seal of Bangsamoro

References

Culture in Bangsamoro
Regional songs
Philippine anthems